The 1896 Cork Junior Hurling Championship was the second staging of the Cork Junior Hurling Championship since its establishment by the Cork County Board.

The final was played on 18 October 1896 at Queenstown Junction Grounds in Glounthaune, between Carrigtwohill and Redmonds. Carrigtwohill won the match by 7-02 to 0-04 to claim their first ever championship title in the grade.

Results

Final

References

Cork Junior Hurling Championship
Cork Junior Hurling Championship